Needhi Pizhaithathu is a 1981 Indian Tamil-language action drama film directed by S. A. Chandrasekhar, starring Vijayakanth, Jaishankar and Mucherla Aruna. It was released on 23 November 1981.

Plot

Cast 
Vijayakanth as Vijay
Mucherla Aruna as Geetha
Jaishankar
Silk Smitha
S. S. Chandran

Soundtrack 
The music was composed by Shankar–Ganesh.

Reception 
Sindhu Jeeva of Kalki wrote .

References

External links 
 

1980 films
1980s Tamil-language films
1981 action drama films
1981 films
Films directed by S. A. Chandrasekhar
Films scored by Shankar–Ganesh
Indian action drama films